Chenopodium detestans, commonly known as the New Zealand fish-guts plant, is an endangered species of flowering plant in the family Amaranthaceae.

References

detestans
Flora of New Zealand